Sidney, Sid, or Syd Owen may refer to:

 Sid Owen (born 1972), British actor who appeared in EastEnders
 Sidney Owen (cricketer) (born 1942), English cricketer for Staffordshire
 Syd Owen (1922–1999), English football player and manager
 Syd Owen (footballer, born 1885) (1885–1925), English football player